The UEFA coaching licences are documents testifying credentials of coaches among members of UEFA. UEFA, the governing body for football in Europe, mandates several coaching licences for professional managers, each valid for coaching at a certain level for all members of the organization. These include the UEFA Pro Licence, the UEFA A Licence, and the UEFA B Licence. They are issued by each UEFA member state's football federation and are valid for three years.

UEFA Pro Licence 
The UEFA Pro Licence is the highest coaching certification available in Europe and generally follows the completion of the 'B' and 'A' licences. A Pro Licence is required for anyone who wishes to manage a football club in the top tier of any European nation's league system on a permanent basis, i.e. more than 12 weeks (the amount of time an unqualified caretaker manager is allowed to take control). Such a licence is also required to manage in the UEFA Champions League and the UEFA Europa League.

UEFA A Licence

The UEFA A Licence is one level below the UEFA Pro Licence and allows holders to be head coaches of youth teams up to age 18, reserve teams (also known as 'B' teams) for top-flight clubs, and men's professional second-tier clubs.

UEFA B Licence 
The UEFA B Licence is one level below the UEFA A Licence, and allows holders to be head coaches of men's amateur clubs, youth teams up to age 16, and assistant coaches for professional clubs.

See also 
AFC Professional Coaching Diploma: the coaching licence of the Asian Football Confederation equivalent to the UEFA Pro Licence.

References

External links 
 UEFA
UEFA coach education
 The Knowledge - Coaching Corner - How does the coaching badge system work? at The Telegraph, 5 December 2005.

Pro Licence
Association football managers